The discography of Australian psychedelic rock band King Gizzard & the Lizard Wizard consists of 23 studio albums, 15 live albums (13 of which were released exclusively to Bandcamp), three compilation albums, one remix album, three extended plays, 51 singles, and 60 music videos.

The band released their first album, 12 Bar Bruise, in 2012. Over the next four years, they followed with seven more studio albums: Eyes Like the Sky and Float Along – Fill Your Lungs in 2013, Oddments and I'm in Your Mind Fuzz in 2014, Quarters! and Paper Mâché Dream Balloon in 2015, and Nonagon Infinity in 2016. Nonagon Infinity was their first album to reach the top 20 in their home country, peaking at number 19 on the Australia Albums Chart. In 2017 they released five studio albums: Flying Microtonal Banana in February; Murder of the Universe in June; Sketches of Brunswick East, a collaboration with Mild High Club (a music project of Alex Brettin), in August; Polygondwanaland, which was released into the public domain, in November; and Gumboot Soup, released on 31 December. 

After an uncharacteristically long interval, the band released their next two albums in 2019: Fishing for Fishies in April and Infest the Rats' Nest in August. Over the course of 2020, with their touring schedule disrupted by the worldwide COVID-19 pandemic, they released seven live albums and two compilation albums, most of these through their bootlegger program. In November 2020, they released their 16th studio album, K.G., followed by the companion album, L.W., the following February. After two Australian "micro" tours in February and April 2021, they released two more live albums. On 11 June 2021 they released their 18th studio album, Butterfly 3000. After a number of vinyl copies were accidentally sent early to record stores in Europe, their 19th studio album, Made in Timeland, was officially released on 5 March 2022. Three days later, their 20th studio album, Omnium Gatherum, was announced. On 7 September 2022, the band announced three new albums to be released in October – Ice, Death, Planets, Lungs, Mushrooms and Lava, Laminated Denim and Changes – and the release of a single, "Ice V". Preorders for the three albums were announced on the website Gizzverse.

Albums

Studio albums

Official remix albums

Official live albums

Bootleg live albums

Bootleg compilation albums

Extended plays

Singles

Music videos

Other appearances

Notes

References

External links 
 Discography at Discogs

Discographies of Australian artists